Beautiful Disaster may refer to:

 "Beautiful Disaster" (311 song), 1997 
 "Beautiful Disaster" (Kelly Clarkson song), 2003
 "Beautiful Disaster", a song by Jon McLaughlin from his 2007 album Indiana
 Beautiful Disaster (novel), a new adult novel by Jamie McGuire
 A Beautiful Disaster, a 2020 album by JellyRoll
 "Beautiful Disaster", a song by American Hi-Fi from their 2003 album The Art of Losing.